Henry Banda (born 16 September 1990) is a retired Zambian football midfielder.

References

1990 births
Living people
Zambian footballers
Zambia international footballers
Kabwe Warriors F.C. players
Zanaco F.C. players
Red Arrows F.C. players
Green Buffaloes F.C. players
NAPSA Stars F.C. players
Association football midfielders
2009 African Nations Championship players
Zambia A' international footballers